Maniac Mansion is a sitcom created by Eugene Levy, which aired concurrently on YTV in Canada and The Family Channel in the United States for three seasons from September 14, 1990, to April 4, 1993.

The series is loosely based on the 1987 video game of the same name by Lucasfilm Games. While Lucasfilm served as co-producers on the series, the show thematically has little in common with its source material (see § Differences from the game).

Overview 
Maniac Mansion centers around the lives of the Edisons, an American family living in a large mansion in the upscale suburban neighborhood of Cedar Springs. The Edisons consist of patriarch Fred (Joe Flaherty), an eccentric scientist and inventor, his level-headed wife Casey (Deborah Theaker), and their children, teenage genius Tina (Kathleen Robertson), prepubescent Ike (Avi Phillips) and precocious toddler Turner (George Buza). Also living in the Edison mansion are Casey's brother Harry Orca (John Hemphill) and his wife Idella Muckle-Orca (Mary Charlotte-Wilcox).

While Maniac Mansion primarily derives its storylines from typical sitcom fare such as family life and parent-child relationships, the series incorporated several prominent elements of science fiction. Fred Edison is a scientist who works out of his basement laboratory which is partially powered by a mysterious extraterrestrial meteorite, and many episodes revolve around Fred's outlandish and occasionally disastrous experiments and inventions. As it is revealed in the series premiere, a mishap with one of these inventions caused genetic mutations in two of the main characters, Turner Edison and Harry Orca: for the complete run of the series, toddler Turner is a fully-grown man with the mind of a child and Harry Orca is a normal-sized housefly with a human head (similar to the 1958 version of The Fly).

Sharing many writers and performers with the 1976–1984 Canadian sketch comedy series Second City Television, Maniac Mansion has a very similar style of humor, featuring much of the dry wit and cultural satire common of SCTV, ranging from pop culture references to film and television parodies. A particular staple of Maniac Mansions comedy was the series' pervasive tendency of breaking the fourth wall, with characters – usually Harry – addressing the audience to comment on the particular episode. Meta-referential humor was also a regular element of the show: a few episodes are presented as "behind the scenes" documentaries, depicting the Edisons as an actual family starring in a sitcom based on their lives.

Cast and characters

Main 
 Joe Flaherty as Dr. Fred Edison, a devoted father and absent-minded scientist.
 Deborah Theaker as Casey Edison, Fred's loving wife.
 Kathleen Robertson as Tina Edison, a popular but brilliant teenage girl who assists Fred in his laboratory.
 Avi Phillips as Ike Edison, an average and slightly rebellious pre-teen.
 George Buza as Turner Edison, a toddler rapidly aged into a huge balding adult body following a scientific accident.
 John Hemphill as Harry Orca, a.k.a. Harry the Fly, Casey's brother who was transformed into a half-man, half-housefly mutant by the same accident which changed Turner.
 Mary Charlotte Wilcox as Idella Muckle-Orca, Harry's neurotic wife.

Recurring 
 Colin Fox as Dr. Edward Edison, a respected scientist and Fred's father.
 Mark Wilson, Wendy Hopkins and Patrick Gillen as Richard, Allasyn and Keifer Pratt, the Edisons' snooty yuppie neighbors.

Guest stars 
 José Ferrer as himself (2-08, "The Celebrity Visitor")
 Teri Austin as herself, (2-10, "Lenny...One Amour Time"; 2-11, "Lenny...One Amour Time: Part 2")
 Dave Thomas as "Hudgie DeRubertis" (2-13, "Buried by the Mob")
 Martin Short as "Eddie O'Donnell" (2-14, "Down and Out in Cedar Springs")
 David Cronenberg as himself (2-19, "Idella's Breakdown")
 Andrea Martin as "Dr. Fontana Blue" (2-19, "Idella's Breakdown")
 Jayne Eastwood as various characters
 Dewey Robertson as "The Atomizer" (3-10, "Wrestling with the Truth")
 Eugene Levy as "Doc Ellis" (3-17, "Freddy had a Little Lamb")
 Jan Rubeš as "Uncle Joe" (3-20, "It Ain't Over 'Til Uncle Joe Sings")

Development and production 
In a special printed in the Summer 1990 issue of The Lucasfilm Fan Club magazine, the initial conception of an episode television series based on Maniac Mansion is credited to Lucasfilm animators Cliff Ruby and Elana Lasser, who pitched the idea to George Lucas. Convinced on the project's potential, Lucasfilm contacted the Toronto-based production company Atlantis Films to begin work on the series.

Atlantis enlisted comedian and former Second City Television writer/performer Eugene Levy to creatively spearhead the development the series. Originally pitched as a more overtly horror/science fiction-themed comedy in the vein of The Addams Family or The Munsters, Levy ultimately rejected this approach, recruiting a number of The Second City alumni and re-working Maniac Mansion from the ground up into the more lighthearted and slightly surreal series it eventually became.

Shot entirely in Toronto, Maniac Mansion premiered on September 14, 1990 on The Family Channel in the United States, and September 17 on YTV in Canada. The series lasted for three seasons and sixty-six episodes before its cancellation in 1993. The series continued to air in syndication on The Family Channel until 1994, on YTV until 1997, and later on Canadian channel Showcase until 2002.

Connection with SCTV 
A large portion of Maniac Mansions cast and crew were made up of alumni from the Toronto comedy troupe The Second City and the 1976-1984 television offshoot Second City Television. In a 1992 article visiting the set of the series, Entertainment Weekly remarked that Maniac Mansion was like an SCTV convention: "The place is packed with veterans of the ... series: There are former SCTV actors, writers, directors, key grips—even Mansions makeup artist is an old SCTVer".

Series creator Eugene Levy was an original cast member and writer on Second City Television, and developed Maniac Mansion alongside fellow Second City writers Michael Short, Paul Flaherty, David Flaherty and director Jamie Paul Rock. Additional writing was often contributed by Second City member Paul Wildman, as were cast members Joe Flaherty, John Hemphill and Mary-Charlotte Wilcox.

Additionally, nearly all of the main cast with the exception of teenaged actors Kathleen Robertson and Avi Phillips were veterans of The Second City. Joe Flaherty was one of the founders of Toronto's Second City and was an original series cast member, while John Hemphill and Mary-Charlotte Wilcox were supporting players and writers in its later seasons. Deborah Theaker, while having had no involvement with Second City Television, was a former member of The Second City stage show, and George Buza had appeared as an extra in one episode of the series.

Naturally, there are numerous SCTV references throughout the series. Levy, Martin Short, Dave Thomas and Andrea Martin all made one-off appearances on the show, as did minor players Juul Haalmeyer, Tony Rosato and Robin Duke. A few jokes are reused and in a couple of episodes, the characters of "Count Floyd" and "Happy Marsden" can be seen playing on television sets.

Episodes 
This Maniac Mansion episode list was compiled from United States Copyright Office database.

Season 1 (1990–91)

Season 2 (1991–92)

Season 3 (1992–93)

Home video 
In 1992, Family Channel Video released a VHS tape entitled "Maniac Mansion: The Love Collection", featuring two first-season episodes of the series, "Flystruck" (#102) and "Fred's A-Courtin'" (#105). This was the only official video release of the series; as of 2018, there are no known plans for Maniac Mansion to be released on DVD.

In 1991, a Japanese company HRS Funai released another VHS tape "マニアック・マンション (Maniac Mansion)", sold in Japan. It contains four first-season episodes, "The 10th Anniversary Special" (#101), "Webs, The Really Tangled Kind" (#110), "Good Cheer On Ya" (#114) and "The Cliffhanger" (#122), each episodes having Japanese subtitles.

Reception

Critical response 
Maniac Mansion received generally positive reviews from professional critics during its initial run. In a press release for the series, Time called it "the looniest, sweetest family comedy of the year", listing it as one of the best shows of 1990. Entertainment Weekly called it "100-proof hilarious", while in a 1990 article on the series, The Los Angeles Times described the show as "a stylized, sharp-edged comedy that's a bit like David Lynch on helium".

However, response from the gaming community, and in particular fans of the original Maniac Mansion and graphic adventure games, has been mixed. In a 2011 retrospective review, PC Gamer magazine offered a predominantly negative opinion, noting the series "has roughly as much to do with the original game as a chipmunk's arsehole resembles Sweden" and calling the two episodes they had seen "comedy vacuums" and "at best generic and at worst, awful", though admitting they couldn't conclusively judge the entire series on so few episodes. The International House of Mojo, a website devoted to LucasArts video games, also lamented the dissimilarity to the game, but believed the series "deserves the courtesy of a second look", calling it "surprisingly sweet-natured" and noting the science fiction elements and "off-beat brand of humor" gave an otherwise typical sitcom a unique personality.

Awards and nominations 
Maniac Mansion was nominated for and won several television awards during the series' run:

Differences from the game 

While ostensibly an adaptation of the 1987 computer game, Maniac Mansion shares several superficial similarities with its source material, though is vastly different in terms of plot, tone and characterization.

The premise of the game, a homage to horror and science fiction B movies, follows a group of teenagers who venture into a dilapidated mansion to rescue their kidnapped friend. The mansion is inhabited by the homicidal Edison family, consisting of Dr. Fred, a deranged scientist who is possessed by an evil meteorite, his wife Edna, a sex-starved sadomasochistic nurse, their son Weird Ed, a paranoid paramilitary survivalist, and their pets Green Tentacle and Purple Tentacle, a pair of sentient, ambulatory tentacles.

Whereas the television series was produced for family television, the tone of the game was decidedly more adult, featuring much risqué black comedy and surreal violence amid LucasArts's traditional style of offbeat humor and slapstick which was entirely omitted from the television adaptation. The game's original characters are also completely absent from the series with the exception of Dr. Fred Edison, whose character was drastically changed from an insane antagonist with a balding, elderly appearance in the game to a clumsy but good-natured family man in his forties in the television show.

The most overt thematic connection the series had to the game was the setting of a mansion housing an extraterrestrial meteor. The meteor itself is seldom referenced in the show, although it is prominently featured in the opening credits of the first season via an expository newspaper clipping, revealing it to have been discovered underneath the mansion by Fred's grandfather Louis Edison. Throughout the series, Fred can be seen conducting various experiments either harnessing the meteor's supernatural powers, or experimenting on the meteor itself.

Ron Gilbert and Gary Winnick, the designers of the original Maniac Mansion, have never made any public comment on their opinion of the television series. However, in Day of the Tentacle, LucasArts' 1993 sequel to Maniac Mansion, the television show serves as a minor plot point in which the game's protagonist Bernard Bernoulli must help collect the royalties that Dr. Fred was promised from a vaguely explained in-universe television series based on a video game based on the events of the first game.

See also 

 Honey, I Shrunk the Kids: The TV Show, a later program with a similar premise, also starring George Buza

References

External links 
 
 Archive of Mansion Site: A fansite for Maniac Mansion

1990s Canadian teen sitcoms
1990 Canadian television series debuts
1993 Canadian television series endings
1990s American teen sitcoms
1990 American television series debuts
1993 American television series endings
Canadian television shows based on video games
English-language television shows
The Family Channel (American TV network, founded 1990) original programming
Television series about families
Television series by Lucasfilm
Television shows filmed in Toronto
YTV (Canadian TV channel) original programming
Live action television shows based on video games